Samuel "Sammy" Monsels (born 2 August 1953) is a Surinamese former sprinter and current athletics trainer. He competed in the 100 metres and 200 metres at the 1972 Summer Olympics and the 1976 Summer Olympics. He is the brother of sprinter Eddy Monsels.

Athletics

Monsels grew up in Suriname and attended Mulo there. He came to the Netherlands in 1971 to compete in  the Kingdom Games, and remained in the Netherlands to undergo training as a technical specialist. In Paramaribo, Monsels was a member of the 'Gazelle' athletics association.

In 1971 Monsels was Surinamese champion in the 100 metres and 200 metres at both the senior level (11.0 seconds and 22.3 seconds) and the junior level (11.0 and 22.5). 

Between 1971 and 1983 Monsels won seven Dutch sprint championships in the 60 metres (indoor) and the 100 and 200 metres (outdoor). Representing the Netherlands, Monsels reached the final of the 60 metres at the 1973 European Athletics Indoor Championships in Rotterdam, finishing fifth. In 1972 and 1976 he competed in the Olympic Games, representing Suriname, reaching the second round of the 100 metres and 200 metres on both occasions. In the late 1970s Monsels quit competitive athletics for a while, but returned in the early 1980s. In 1982 he represented Suriname at the Central American and Caribbean Games in Havana.

As late as 1990, Monsels competed in the Netherlands national indoor athletics championships in The Hague, finishing third in the 60 metres with a time of 6.89 seconds, behind Emiel Mellaard and Frank Perri.

Military

In 1974 Monsels was a tank driver in the Royal Netherlands Army. In 1975 he returned to Suriname from the Netherlands as the country became independent. He became a sports instructor in the Suriname National Army. After the 1980 coup, he received a promotion and became sports chief in the Surinamese army. In 1983, he acted as an intermediary between strongman Dési Bouterse and the exiled former President Henk Chin A Sen. In 1987 he left the Surinamese army and moved to the Netherlands.

Singer

In 1988, Monsels released a reggae-pop single called "No Bombs, No Guns, All We Need Is Peace And Harmony".

Trainer

In 1992, Monsels founded Atletiek Vereniging Bijlmer, an athletics club in Bijlmermeer and was trainer and president of the association until 1997. Then in 1999 he founded Continental Sport, another athletics club in the area. He again was trainer and president.

December murders
In 2002, after questioning by Surinamese judge Albert Ramnewash, Monsels said he was in Fort Zeelandia on 8 December 1982 but was not involved in the killings.

Netherlands championships 
Outdoor

Indoor

Personal records

References

External links
 

1953 births
Living people
Athletes (track and field) at the 1972 Summer Olympics
Athletes (track and field) at the 1976 Summer Olympics
Dutch male sprinters
Surinamese male sprinters
Olympic athletes of Suriname
Competitors at the 1982 Central American and Caribbean Games
Sportspeople from Paramaribo
Royal Netherlands Army personnel
Surinamese military personnel
December murders
20th-century Surinamese male singers
Athletics (track and field) coaches